Jared Eiseley Palmer (born July 2, 1971) is a professional tennis player who won 28 professional doubles titles (Including his wins at the Australian Open and Wimbledon) and one singles title in his career on the ATP Tour. He also won four double titles on the challenger's circuit (two in 1992 and two in 1993). Palmer turned professional in 1991 after winning the 1991 NCAA Division 1 singles title as a sophomore playing for Stanford University.

Palmer's biggest doubles titles came at the 1995 Australian Open and the 2001 Wimbledon. Palmer also won the ATP Masters Series event at Indian Wells in 2000. Additionally, Palmer reached the doubles final at two other Grand Slam events, Wimbledon in 1999 and the US Open in 2001. Palmer made the finals at six additional AMS events: Canada (1994 and 2001), Miami (1994 and 2002), Hamburg (1999) and Paris (1999).

Palmer was ranked the World No. 1 men's doubles player on March 20, 2000. He was also ranked as high as World No. 35 in singles. His lone singles title on the ATP tour came at (Pinehurst in 1994). Palmer retired from tennis in 2005 after earning $3,471,164 in career prize money while on the ATP Tour.

Palmer resided in Palo Alto and Stockholm.

Junior Grand Slam finals

Singles: 1 (1 runner-up)

Doubles: 1 (1 title)

ATP career finals

Singles: 2 (1 title, 1 runner-up)

Doubles: 51 (28 titles, 23 runner-ups)

ATP Challenger and ITF Futures finals

Singles: 5 (2–3)

Doubles: 11 (9–2)

Performance timelines

Singles

Doubles

Mixed doubles

References

External links 
 
 
 

1971 births
Living people
American expatriate sportspeople in Sweden
American male tennis players
Australian Open (tennis) champions
Sportspeople from New York City
Sportspeople from Palo Alto, California
Stanford Cardinal men's tennis players
Tennis people from California
Tennis people from New York (state)
US Open (tennis) champions
Wimbledon champions
Wimbledon junior champions
Tennis players at the 2000 Summer Olympics
Grand Slam (tennis) champions in mixed doubles
Grand Slam (tennis) champions in men's doubles
Grand Slam (tennis) champions in boys' doubles
Olympic tennis players of the United States
ATP number 1 ranked doubles tennis players